Azha is one of the Loloish languages spoken by the Yi people of China.

Innovations
In Azha, the words for ‘goat’, ‘eat’, and ‘drink’ are innovative (Pelkey 2011:377). Luojiayi Azha  ‘goat’,  ‘eat’,  ‘drink’ are not derived from Proto-Ngwi *(k)-citL ‘goat’, *dza² ‘eat’, and *m-daŋ¹ ‘drink’.

References

Pelkey, Jamin. 2011. Dialectology as Dialectic: Interpreting Phula Variation. Berlin: De Gruyter Mouton.

Loloish languages
Languages of China